Hildegard Mende (born 24 November 1922) was a female guard (Aufseherin, in German) in two concentration camps  during World War II. She was employed in Ravensbrück and then in the small fortress of Theresienstadt concentration camp and ghetto in Czechoslovakia. About 88,000 Jews were deported from Theresienstadt; over 33,000 are known to have been murdered or died in the camp itself. She gained the nickname "The Beast" for her alleged sadism.
 
Her husband was Herbert Mende (1 February 1919 – 1997), a "Polish German, a boxer, a member of the Prague Gestapo, from prison in June 1940 who was appointed guard in Terezin, and was known for his harsh interrogations. On September 24, 1948, he was sentenced in absentia to death. However, he lived in the GDR and with impunity since 1969 in Germany, where he died in 1997. As an overseer, he worked in Theresienstadt with his wife Hildegard, who was allegedly able to kill prisoners with their bare hands."

References

In literature
(Ebbinghaus 1987): Ebbinghaus, A.: Opfer und Täterinnen. Frauenbiographien des Nationalsozialismus. Nördlingen 1987 Reprinted 1996: . In German.
Schäfer, S.: Zum Selbstverständnis von Frauen im Konzentrationslager: das Lager Ravensbrück. PhD thesis 2002, TU Berlin. (PDF, 741 kB). In German.
Taake, C.: Angeklagt: SS-Frauen vor Gericht; Bibliotheks- und Informationssystem der Univ. Oldenburg, 1998. In German.

External links
 https://archive.today/20130202222710/http://enc.slider.com/Enc/Ravensbruck_Trial

1922 births
Possibly living people
Ravensbrück concentration camp personnel
Theresienstadt concentration camp personnel
Place of birth missing
Female guards in Nazi concentration camps